Painted face may refer to:

Body painting#Face painting
Jing (Chinese opera), also known as painted face, a principal role type in Chinese opera
Painted Faces, a 1988 Hong Kong film about a Chinese opera school
The Painted Faces, a 1960s American rock band

See also
Paint Your Face, a 2009 studio album by French recording artist Sliimy